The Sun and the Moon is an unipkaaqtuat, a story in Inuit folklore. The traditional explanation for the movement of the Sun and Moon through the sky is a brother and sister are constantly chasing each other across the sky. The story also explains the dappled gray appearance of the moon as soot smeared on his face.

Names
The brother is most often called Aningaat. In other versions he is simply called Moon (Inuktitut:). He is sometimes equated with Tarqiup Inua.

The sister is most commonly called Sun (Inuktitut:). Other times she is simply called "Aningaat's sister". One account from Hans Egede reports her being called Malina or Ajut in Greenland.

Versions
There are two parts to the story: the part about the blind boy and the loon, and the part about the sister and brother becoming the sun and moon.

Full tellings of the story include: Repulse Bay storyteller Ivaluardjuk's telling from the early 1920s, Netsilik storyteller Thomas Kusugaq's telling from 1950, Igloolik storyteller George Kappianaq's telling from 1986, and Igloolik storyteller Alexina Kublu's telling from 1999.

The sun and moon part is sometimes told without the blind boy part. Such tellings include the 1880s account by Franz Boas of what is reportedly an Akudnirmiut and Oqomiut version, and a 1990 telling by Igloolik storyteller Hervé Paniaq.

The blind boy part is also sometimes told without the sun and moon part, particularly by Athabaskan peoples to the west and south.

Blind boy and loon

Aningaat and his sister are orphans living with their grandmother. (In some tellings their mother or stepmother.) The brother is blind. One day a polar bear comes to their camp, to the window of their house. The blind brother shoots the bear through the window, but his grandmother lies and says he only hit the window frame. The grandmother butchers the bear in secret, keeping the meat for herself and the girl. The boy is given dog meat, and not even allowed to live in the main house. The sister gives bear meat to her brother in secret.

The brother asks his sister to take him to a nearby lake where there are red-throated loons. The brother stands by the lake until he hears the sound of a kayak and a voice invites him to sit in it. He sits down and is paddled toward the center of the lake. (In Kusugaq's telling he is simply lead into the lake, no kayak.) They are submerged. When Aningaat needs air, they resurface. After taking air, they dive again. The stranger asks if he can see. This repeats several times: they dive, the stranger asks the boy if he can see. The stranger licks the boy's eyes (a detailing absent in Ivaluardjuk's version) and they dive again. Each time the boy can see a little more, and by the end he is no longer blind. The stranger is a loon (a detail not specified in Kappianaq's version).

Returning home, Aningaat questions his grandmother about the bearskin he can now see. She lies, saying she got it from people who visited in an umiaq.

Now that he can see, the boy makes a harpoon and uses it with white whales passing along the shore. One day his grandmother comes hunting whales with him, serving as the anchor for the harpoon line. She tells him to harpoon the smallest whale, but he harpoons the largest. The large whale pulls her into the water, she surfaces once more, then disappears under the water. (In Kappianaq's version she becomes a narwhal, her hair becoming the horn.)

Aningaat and his sister move to a new camp. There, while getting water, the sister is attacked. The brother saves her. He heals her, then they move to a new camp.

They move to a new camp, inhabited by people who lack genitalia or anuses. Nonetheless both siblings marry people form this group, and the sister becomes pregnant and gives birth.

Sun and moon
This version is much like the blind boy version, except it only covers the end of the story, beginning with the assault in the dark.

During a festivity, someone comes into the sister's dwelling, extinguishes her qulliq lamp, and either fondles her or lays with her. Knowing it will happen again, she puts soot on her face. Her visitor comes again, getting soot on himself this time. When he leaves. she follows. There is laughter coming from the communal  where the festivity is happening. She goes and sees. The people are laughing at Aningaat because he has soot on his face. She's devastated by this. She cuts off one breast (merely exposes it in Kappianaq) and offers it to him, saying if he likes her body so much, eat this! (The bit about the breast is entirely absent in Kusugaq's telling.) A chase ensues. Both are carrying torches but the brother's goes out. The chase ascends to the heavens where they become the Sun and Moon, still chasing each other.

Third version
Knud Rasmussen Report of the Fifth Thule Expedition 1921–24 has a transcript of a Pâdlermiut story told by a storyteller named Kibkârjuk. This one is largely different from the others, but still includes they key elements of an incestuous brother and sister becoming the sun and moon, the sun torch flaming while the moon torch is only embers.

There were once a brother and sister who lived together as man and wife. This they did secretly, lying together only when none could see. But then it happened that they were surprised. People came and found them lying together. And at this they were so overwhelmed with shame that they rose up from the earth, rose up into the sky. It was winter, and it was dark, and both carried torches. The moon was moving very rapidly, because he was a man (aɳuta•ugame nakᴇr-tɔrjuᴀq, nakᴇrtɔq: swift, with speed); so rapidly did he rush up into the sky that his torch went out, but the sun rose up slowly because she was a woman, and her torch did not go out. Therefore the sun gives out both light and heat, while the moon gives only light from the embers of the torch, and gives no heat. Thus the moon and the sun came up into the sky.

See also
 First sunrise, a ritual that was inspired by the myth
 Brother and sister who became the sun and moon, a Korean story

References

Tellings of the tale
 Versions sourced to a storyteller

 Unsourced versions

Scholarship

Inuit deities
Incest in mythology